Paul Charles Jules Robert (19 October 1910, Orléansville, French Algeria – 11 August 1980, Mougins, Alpes-Maritimes, France), usually called Paul Robert, was a French lexicographer and publisher, best known for his large Dictionnaire alphabétique et analogique de la langue française (1953), often called simply the Robert, and its abridgement, the Petit Robert (1967); who founded the dictionary company Dictionnaires Le Robert.

Bibliography 
 Paul Robert, Aventures et mésaventures d'un dictionnaire, Paris: Société du nouveau Littré 'Le Robert', 1971.

See also 
 Alain Rey

1910 births
1980 deaths
People from Chlef
Pieds-Noirs
French lexicographers
French male non-fiction writers
20th-century French male writers
20th-century lexicographers
Migrants from French Algeria to France